The Mare Australe quadrangle is one of a series of 30 quadrangle maps of Mars used by the United States Geological Survey (USGS) Astrogeology Research Program. The Mare Australe quadrangle is also referred to as MC-30 (Mars Chart-30). The quadrangle covers all the area of Mars south of 65°, including the South polar ice cap, and its surrounding area. The quadrangle's name derives from an older name for a feature that is now called Planum Australe, a large plain surrounding the polar cap.  The Mars polar lander crash landed in this region.

Notable features

Around the southern ice cap is a surface, called the Dorsa Argentea Formation that may be an old ice-rich deposit.  It contains a group of sinuous, branched ridges that resembles eskers that form when streams are under glaciers. The formation often contains pits: two major locations are named Cavi Angusti and Cavi Sisyphi.  The pits have steep sides and an irregular shape.  They are up to 50 km across and 1 km deep.

The quadrangle also contains Angustus Labyrinthus, a formation of intersecting valley or ridges, nicknamed the "Inca City".  Researchers were surprised to see parts of the surface having a Swiss-cheese appearance.  Also, some areas showed strange spider-shaped forms, which were determined to be caused by carbon dioxide gas blowing dust around at certain times of the year.

Some craters in Mare Australe show gullies.  Martian gullies are small, incised networks of narrow channels and their associated downslope sediment deposits, found on the planet of Mars. They are named for their resemblance to terrestrial gullies. First discovered on images from Mars Global Surveyor, they occur on steep slopes, especially on the walls of craters. Usually, each gully has a dendritic alcove at its head, a fan-shaped apron at its base, and a single thread of incised channel linking the two, giving the whole gully an hourglass shape. They are believed to be relatively young because they have few, if any craters. A subclass of gullies is also found cut into the faces of sand dunes which themselves considered to be quite young. 
On the basis of their form, aspects, positions, and location amongst and apparent interaction with features thought to be rich in water ice, many researchers believed that the processes carving the gullies involve liquid water. However, this remains a topic of active research.
As soon as gullies were discovered, researchers began to image many gullies over and over, looking for possible changes.  By 2006, some changes were found.  Later, with further analysis it was determined that the changes could have occurred by dry granular flows rather than being driven by flowing water. With continued observations many more changes were found in Gasa Crater and others.
With more repeated observations, more and more changes have been found; since the changes occur in the winter and spring, experts are tending to believe that gullies were formed from dry ice. Before-and-after images demonstrated the timing of this activity coincided with seasonal carbon-dioxide frost and temperatures that would not have allowed for liquid water.  When dry ice frost changes to a gas, it may lubricate dry material to flow especially on steep slopes.  In some years frost, perhaps as thick as 1 meter.

Freezing of atmosphere

Research based on slight changes in the orbits of spacecraft around Mars over 16 years found that when one hemisphere experiences winter, approximately 3 trillion to 4 trillion tons of carbon dioxide freezes out of the atmosphere onto the northern and southern polar caps. This represents 12 to 16 percent of the mass of the entire Martian atmosphere.  These observation support predictions from the Mars Global Reference Atmospheric Model—2010.

Lake of liquid water
Scientists reported in July 2018, the discovery of a lake of liquid water under the southern ice cap.  The measurements were gathered with the  Mars Advanced Radar for Subsurface and Ionosphere Sounding (MARSIS) on board the European Space Agency's orbiting Mars Express spacecraft.  Radar reflections showed a bright spot in the ice layers that analysis later showed that it had to be a lake of liquid water.  It is believed that the water remains liquid, even at the temperature of -68 degrees Celsius because there is likely much dissolved salt that lowers the freezing point.  The lake is about 20 kilometers across and at least 10 centimeters deep  It could contain 10 billion liters of liquid water.  There could very well be many small bodies of water under the ice cap; however, they are difficult to detect with MARSIS.  Also, the raw date coverage needed for these detections is limited—only a few percent of the area has a full set of data.

Spiders

During the winter, much frost accumulates.  It freezes out directly onto the surface of the permanent polar cap, which is made of water ice covered with layers of dust and sand.  The deposit begins as a layer of dusty  frost. Over the winter, it recrystallizes and becomes denser. The dust and sand particles caught in the frost slowly sink. By the time temperatures rise in the spring, the frost layer has become a slab of semi-transparent ice about 3 feet thick, lying on a substrate of dark sand and dust.  This dark material absorbs light and causes the ice to sublimate (turn directly into a gas) below the surface.  Eventually much gas accumulates and becomes pressurized.  When it finds a weak spot, the gas escapes and blows out the dust.  Speeds can reach 100 miles per hour.  Dark channels can sometimes be seen; they are called "spiders." The surface appears covered with dark spots when this process is occurring.  The official name for spiders is "araneiforms." These features can be seen in some of the pictures below.

Defrosting

As the temperature warms and more sunlight becomes available in the spring, frost starts to disappear.  This process begins with the appearance of dark spots.  By the time the temperature rises to the melting point of water ice, all ice is gone.  The process was first followed with repeated images by the Mars Global Surveyor.  With the much greater resolution of HiRISE, it was seen that many spots had the shape of fans. Some of these spots and fans are visible in the pictures below.  Thousands of fans were examined by a Citizen Science project. Nearly all (96%) of the fans measured in this study have a length below 100m. The average fan length is at 33.1m. The three largest fans  lengths of 373m, 368m and 361m and were all in the same region.

Dust devil tracks

Many areas on Mars, including Eridania, experience the passage of giant dust devils.  A thin coating of fine bright dust covers most of the Martian surface.  When a dust devil goes by it blows away the coating and exposes the underlying dark surface.

Dust devils occur when the sun warms up the air near a flat, dry surface. The warm air then rises quickly through the cooler air and begins spinning while moving ahead. This spinning, moving cell may pick up dust and sand then leave behind a clean surface.

Dust devils have been seen from the ground and high overhead from orbit.  They have even blown the dust off of the solar panels of the two Rovers on Mars, thereby greatly extending their lives.  The twin Rovers were designed to last for 3 months, instead they lasted more than six years, and one is still going after 8 years.  The pattern of the tracks have been shown to change every few months.

A study that combined data from the High Resolution Stereo Camera (HRSC) and the Mars Orbiter Camera (MOC) found that some large dust devils on Mars have a diameter of 700 meters and last at least 26 minutes.

Dorsa Argentea Formation

The Dorsa Argentea Formation (DAF) is thought to be a large system of eskers that were under an ancient ice cap in the south polar region of Mars. This large polar ice sheet is believed to have covered about 1.5 million square kilometers.  That area is twice the area of the state of Texas.  The ice sheet formed near the boundary of the Noachian-Hesperian era and receded in the early Hesperian era.  A thick ice sheet was able to be formed more easily in the south polar region than in the North pole because the south pole is higher in altitude.  There may have been much more water available in the Martian atmosphere when the ice sheet developed.

This group of ridges extends from 270–100 E and 70–90 S, around the south pole of Mars.  It sits under the Late Amazonian South Polar Layered Deposits (SPLD).  The amount of these ridges is huge, one study studied seven different ridge systems which contained almost 4,000 ridges that had a total length 51,000 km.

Most eskers are thought to be formed inside ice-walled tunnels by streams which flowed within and under glaciers. After the retaining ice walls melted away, stream deposits remained as long winding ridges.

MARSIS radar data suggest that significant areas of layered, potentially ice-rich parts of the Dorsa Argentea Formation remain today.

A team of researchers used an early Mars global climate model together with the University of Maine Ice Sheet Model to determine how the eskers formed.  They concluded that to get enough a high enough temperature in the Martian atmosphere to form the ice sheet, a greenhouse gas in addition to a thicker carbon dioxide atmosphere was needed to warm the surface near the poles by at least 20 degrees C.  Also, to produce the shape of the ice sheet, at least part of the Tharsis volcanoes needed to be present.

Proof for ocean
Strong evidence for a one time ancient ocean was found from data gathered from the north and south poles.  In March 2015, a team of scientists published results showing that this region was highly enriched with deuterium, heavy hydrogen, by seven times as much as the Earth.  This means that Mars has lost a volume of water 6.5 times what is stored in today's polar caps.  The water for a time would have formed an ocean in the low-lying Mare Boreum. The amount of water could have covered the planet about 140 meters, but was probably in an ocean that in places would be almost 1 mile deep.

This international team used ESO’s Very Large Telescope, along with instruments at the W. M. Keck Observatory and the NASA Infrared Telescope Facility, to map out different forms of water in Mars’s atmosphere over a six-year period.

Craters

Craters showing layers

Many places on Mars show rocks arranged in layers. The study of layering on Mars greatly expanded when the Mars Global Surveyor sent back images.  Rock can form layers in a variety of ways.  Volcanoes, wind, or water can produce layers.
A detailed discussion of layering with many Martian examples can be found in Sedimentary Geology of Mars.  A paper by Grotzinger and Milliken discusses the role of water and wind in forming layers of sedimentary rocks.  Since craters are low spots on the landscape material can more easily accumulate there and may resist erosion longer than other places.

Craters showing defrosting in spring

Polygons
Much of the surface of Mars shows the ground arranged into polygons of various sizes.  Sometimes, during the right season the lows areas of polygons are full of frost.  When this happens, the shapes are enhanced forming beautiful views.

Swiss Cheese Terrain
Parts of Mare Australe display pits that make the surface look like 
Swiss cheese. These pits are in a 1-10 meter thick layer of dry ice that is sitting on a much larger water ice cap.  Pits have been observed to begin with small areas along faint fractures.  The circular pits have steep walls that work to focus sunlight, thereby increasing erosion.  For a pit to develop a steep wall of about 10 cm and a length of over 5 meters in necessary.

Layers

Other features in Mare Australe quadrangle

Other Mars quadrangles

Interactive Mars map

See also

 Climate of Mars
 Dust Devil Tracks 
 HiRISE
 Impact crater
 List of quadrangles on Mars
 Martian polar ice caps
 Swiss cheese features
 Geyser (Mars)
 Water on Mars
 Martian Gullies

References

External links 

 
Mars